Tricheurymerus obscurus is a species of beetle in the family Cerambycidae. It was described by Prosen in 1947.

References

Ectenessini
Beetles described in 1947